Verkhnyaya Kitsa is a rural locality (a village) in Vinogradovsky District, Arkhangelsk Oblast, Russia. The population was 116 as of 2010. There are 4 streets.

Geography 
Verkhnyaya Kitsa is located on the Vaga River, 41 km south of Bereznik (the district's administrative centre) by road. Bereznichek is the nearest rural locality.

References 

Rural localities in Vinogradovsky District